Firebase Phoenix was a small American firebase in the Korengal valley in Kunar Province, Afghanistan.
The valley is 20 km from the Pakistani border, northwest of the Khyber Pass and northeast of Tora Bora.

One of the purposes of the Firebase was to guard and help facilitate those rebuilding the Pech River Road.
The American Forces Press Service quoted Sergeant first class Jose Magaña:

References

Military installations of the United States in Afghanistan
Kunar Province
Fire support bases